David Friday (1876–1945) president of the U.S. state of Michigan's Michigan Agricultural College (now Michigan State University) from 1922 to 1923.

Friday was a graduate of the University of Michigan and a member of Alpha Kappa Psi professional business fraternity.

During his presidency Michigan State created its first Ph.D. program.

External links
Biographical information (Michigan State University Archives & Historical Collections)

University of Michigan alumni
1876 births
1945 deaths
Presidents of Michigan State University